The President of the Pennsylvania State University is the chief administrator of the Pennsylvania State University, serving as chief executive officer of the institution and an ex officio member of the 32-member Penn State Board of Trustees. Included in the list below are all Presidents of the Pennsylvania State University and its precursor institutions, from the first President Evan Pugh and through the current President, Neeli Bendapudi. There have been 19 Presidents of the Pennsylvania State University, not including three interregnum presidencies during university presidential transitions.

Pennsylvania's only land-grant university, the Pennsylvania State University was established in 1855 as the Farmers' High School of Pennsylvania, before becoming the Agricultural College of Pennsylvania in 1863 under University President Evan Pugh, the Pennsylvania State College under James Calder in 1874 and, finally, the Pennsylvania State University under Milton S. Eisenhower in 1953. Today, the university is part of the Commonwealth System of Higher Education and is one of the largest universities in the United States.

List of presidents

See also
 History of the Pennsylvania State University

References

External links
 The Pennsylvania State University
 Penn State Presidents at the Penn State University Libraries
 Penn State Office of the President

Pennsylvania State University
Presidents of Pennsylvania State University
Pennsylvania State